The 2013–14 Gardner–Webb Runnin' Bulldogs men's basketball team represented Gardner–Webb University during the 2013–14 NCAA Division I men's basketball season. The Runnin' Bulldogs, led by first year head coach Tim Craft, played their home games at the Paul Porter Arena and were members of the South Division of the Big South Conference. They finished the season 18–15, 10–6 in Big South play to finish in a three-way tie for second place in the South Division. They advanced to the quarterfinals of the Big South Conference tournament where they lost to VMI.

Roster

Schedule

|-
!colspan=9 style=| Regular season

|-
!colspan=9 style=| Big South tournament

References

Gardner–Webb Runnin' Bulldogs men's basketball seasons
Gardner-Webb
Gardner
Gardner